Suddenly, a Woman! is a 1963 Danish drama film directed by Anker Sørensen and starring Laila Andersson.

Plot
In this drama, a young woman is pretty enough to draw lovers to her like flies to honey. Among her suitors are her wealthy business-magnate employer and her lesbian landlady. Unfortunately for all of them, the young woman only has eyes for her childhood sweetheart. The would-be lovers prove themselves to be poor sports and mayhem ensues.

Cast
 Laila Andersson - Gudrun
 Jørgen Buckhøj - Manne
 Poul Reichhardt - Chefen
 Nils Asther - Londonchefen
 Birgitte Federspiel - Husværtinden
 Elsa Kourani - Mrs. Hollund
 Yvonne Ingdal - Office Girl
 Albert Watson

References

External links

1963 films
1960s Danish-language films
1963 drama films
Danish drama films